The 1999 cricket season was the 100th in which the County Championship has been an official competition. The title was won by Surrey. Sponsorship by Britannic Assurance came to an end with PPP (Private Patients Plan) Healthcare taking over and the decision was made to split the championship into two divisions the following season. The top nine teams would form the first division with the bottom nine teams going into the second division. The Sunday League changed to a new format National League with games played midweek under floodlight. On the international scene, England hosted the 1999 Cricket World Cup and New Zealand defeated England 2–1 in the Test series.

Honours
County Championship - Surrey
NatWest Trophy - Gloucestershire
CGU National League - Lancashire
Benson & Hedges Super Cup - Gloucestershire
Minor Counties Championship - Cumberland
MCCA Knockout Trophy - Bedfordshire
Second XI Championship - Middlesex II 
Wisden - Chris Cairns, Rahul Dravid, Lance Klusener, Tom Moody, Saqlain Mushtaq

World Cup

Test series

New Zealand tour

County Championship

National League

NatWest Trophy

Benson & Hedges Cup

Leading batsmen

Leading bowlers

References

External sources
 CricketArchive – season and tournament itineraries

Annual reviews
 Playfair Cricket Annual 2000
 Wisden Cricketers' Almanack 2000

English cricket seasons in the 20th century
English Cricket Season, 1999